The National Taitung University Library and Information Center is the academic library of National Taitung University in Taitung City, Taitung County, Taiwan.

History
The library was inaugurated on 8 December 2014 after being constructed with a cost of NT$460 million.

Architecture
The shape of the library resembles a pyramid with elements of mountains and ocean. Its roof is filled with grass. It has a total floor area of 13,000 m2 with 6,500 m2 reading area.

Awards
 FIABCI World Prix d’Excellence Award for Public Infrastructure Amenities (2019)
 Architizer.com one of the eight most special libraries in the world

See also
 Education in Taiwan

References

External links

  

2014 establishments in Taiwan
Academic libraries in Taiwan
Buildings and structures in Taitung County
Libraries established in 2014
National Taitung University